Danilo Pérez (born December 29, 1965) is a Panamanian pianist, composer, educator, and a social activist. His music is a blend of Panamanian roots with elements of Latin American folk music, jazz, European impressionism, African, and other musical heritages that promote music as a multi-dimensional bridge between people. He has released eleven albums as a leader, and appeared on many recordings as a side man, which have earned him critical acclaim, numerous accolades, Grammy Awards wins and nominations. He is a recipient of the United States Artists Fellowship, and the 2009 Smithsonian Legacy Award.

Biography 
Born in Panama in 1965, Danilo Pérez started his musical studies at the age of three with his father, Danilo Enrico Pérez Urriola, an elementary and middle school educator and well known Panamanian singer. In 1967 his father wrote a university thesis which stated that the entire curriculum should be taught through music. He used these techniques to teach his son mathematics, science and other subjects through music, therefore rhythm and interconnective learning became the foundation of Perez's youth. By age 10, Pérez was studying the European classical piano repertoire at the National Conservatory in Panama. In 1985 Pérez was awarded a Fulbright Scholarship to study in the United States. After initially enrolling at[Indiana University of Pennsylvania], Pérez quickly transferred to the Berklee College of Music after being awarded the Quincy Jones Scholarship. While still a student, he performed with Jon Hendricks, Terence Blanchard, Slide Hampton, Claudio Roditi and Paquito D'Rivera. Pérez received a degree in jazz composition and upon graduation he began touring and recording with artists such as Jack DeJohnette, Steve Lacy, Lee Konitz, Charlie Haden, Michael Brecker, Joe Lovano, Tito Puente, Wynton Marsalis, Tom Harrell, Gary Burton, and Roy Haynes.

In 1989, two events occurred that have proven of lasting influence on both Pérez's creative practice as well as his thinking regarding music as a tool for social change. That year Pérez became the youngest member appointed to Dizzy Gillespie's United Nation Orchestra. "He really showed me the power of music as a diplomatic tool, the power of music in intercultural dialogue", says Pérez of Gillespie, "He constantly asked me who are you, how are you and wanted a non-musical answer, he wanted to hear about your life where you come from. How you speak, and how you dance. He encouraged us to use music in a creative ways to respond to all these questions". He wanted to be remembered as a humanitarian. This was my first experience with jazz as something beyond a style of music. "I remember one time playing a solo, and I was very proud of playing in the bebop language, everybody was complimenting me, but Dizzy said: 'That's good young man, but you can bring some more of your Panamanian folklore into it. "I will never forget that."

Pérez remained a member of the United Nation Orchestra until Gillespie's passing in 1992. In December, 1989 he returned to his native Panama to perform for the first time with his own ensemble made up of musicians from the United States and Spain. About the engagement Pérez says, "The concert got cancelled because two days after the band arrived, the US invaded Panama. The entire country was scared. We were fearful of the military intervention and the future was uncertain. But we all decided to improvise and face the unknown, as it happens in jazz, and we went forward with the concert, in the middle of the US invasion. With our musical shield, we were confident no bullets could enter our spirit. The club was packed with people for and against the invasion who got together and decided to celebrate life. We laughed, hugged, and cried. On that day we had a country (in a small club) without an invasion for 2 hours. I learned then that the power of music could be an antidote against war, misunderstanding, hate and suffering, and that music is one of the most effective tools to redirect humanity in the quest for peace".

Music career
Pérez started on piano when he was three years old. At ten, he studied at the National Conservatory in Panama. By age 12, he was working professionally as a musician. He moved to the U.S. to study music, attending Indiana University of Pennsylvania and then switching to the Berklee College of Music in Boston. At Berklee, he worked with Jon Hendricks, Claudio Roditi, and Terence Blanchard.

In 1989, Pérez became a member of Dizzy Gillespie's United Nation Orchestra. The album Live at the Royal Festival Hall won a Grammy Award. He remained with the band until Gillespie died in 1992. In October 1998, he told The Independent that "One of the things Dizzy taught me was to learn about my own heritage even more than I knew already. He said it was more important for jazz for you to get to what your own roots are, than to learn about other things."

In 1993 Pérez turned his focus to his own work as a bandleader and composer and has gone on to release eleven albums as a leader. Perez released his first album, Danilo Perez, on the Novus label. In 1994, at the age of 27, Perez released what is considered his most personal album, The Journey, a musical account of the torturous trip enslaved Africans made across the oceans in the hulls of the slave ships. The album made it to the top ten jazz lists of New York's Village Voice, the New York Times, Billboard, and the Boston Globe. It also allowed Perez to become a recognizable name in the jazz community. Critics have hailed The Journey, Perez's second recording, for its quality of composition and incorporation of Pan-African influences into a jazz context. Perez set up the album as a dream series tracing the route of slaves, stolen or sold from their homes and transported across the sea. The Journey begins with "The Capture", makes its way through "The Taking", "Chains", "The Voyage", and finishes with "Libre Spiritus". According to Minstrel Music Network, "On The Journey, Perez ... seeks to blur the distinctions between musical styles, through his all-encompassing vision, and (by implication) to eradicate the distinctions between those people native to the Americas, and the Africans and Europeans who mixed with them to cast the alloy of multiculturalism." In 1995 Pérez was appointed to the faculty of the New England Conservatory. In the year 1996 he released Panamonk, a tribute to Thelonious Monk which DownBeat named "One of the most important jazz piano albums in the history". He also performed at the 1996 Summer Olympics in Atlanta with Wynton Marsalis. Mr Perez also performed as a special guest at President Bill Clinton's Inaugural Ball. He also played the piano on the Bill Cosby TV show theme song, and participated in the Arturo Sandoval Grammy-winning album, Danzon.

He received his first commission in 1995 from the Concorso Internazionale di Composizione. He immediately began applying the concepts he had been working on in the jazz setting of merging the multiple musical languages and the cultural traditions they represent to large scale compositions. The resulting work, Pan-American Suite, a double concerto for vibraphone, piano and orchestra combined the musical traditions of Panamanian folk music and western classical forms and was premiered by Gary Burton and the composer in the soloist roles.

In 1998, his album Central Avenue, placed mejoranera music (a style of Panamanian folklore singing) within a contemporary jazz context and earned Grammy and Latin Grammy nominations. Both albums received the Boston Music Awards and was chosen as one of the 10 best recordings across genres by Time magazine in 1998.

A subsequent commission from the Chicago Jazz Festival in 1999 for the saxophonist Steve Lacy, Suite for the Americas incorporated American and Latin American folk music with the traditional elements of jazz and was scored for jazz quartet and the American folk instruments of blues guitarist John Primer with the Latin folk singer Luciana Souza and bata drums. Pérez later recorded the piece for his 2000 release Motherland. That same year he received the first of two commissions from Lincoln Center.

In 2000, he joined Wayne Shorter in a quartet with John Patitucci and Brian Blade. Performing with the group extensively since then, and appears on all four of the recordings Shorter has made during this period: Footprints Live! (2002), Alegría (2003), Beyond the Sound Barrier (2005), and Without a Net (2013). The ensemble has received the Jazz Journalists Association award for Small Ensemble of the Year six times, first in 2002, and as recently as 2015; a testament to both the innovative beginnings and the continued vitality of a group that continues to redefine the musical possibilities of the jazz chamber music setting. The ensemble's first release Footprints Live! received the "Album of the Year Award" in 2003 from the Jazz Journalist Association and the DownBeat Critics and Readers polls. The ensemble's second release Beyond the Sound Barrier received a Grammy award for Best Jazz Instrumental Performance Individual or Group. The ensemble's most recent release Without a Net received "Album of the Year" honors from the Jazz Journalists Association, the DownBeat and NPR Jazz Critics polls. The performance techniques of the ensemble have formed the basis of new pedagogy for the study of the relationship between improvisation and composition and is the subject of numerous research studies in jazz. Regarding Shorter, Pérez says, "Wayne has encouraged me to write what I hope for and what I wish the world to be."

In 2003, Pérez founded Panama Jazz Festival with the stated mission of bettering the lives of people through shared musical experiences as listeners, on stage and in the classrooms. About the festival Pérez states, "By offering performances and educational activities of the highest order, as well as practical, hands on training in the music business, the Panama Jazz Festival  aims to inspire and educate while providing tools and opportunities to build a better future for individuals and their communities." As such, while the festival annually offers a rich program of concerts by leading international jazz musicians, the emphasis is on music education. It has become the largest music education event in the region and includes classical programs as well as the Latin American Symposium on Music Therapy and an annual symposium on AfroPanamanian traditions. The festival also supports the year-round educational programs of Danilo Pérez Foundation, which brings art and music to children living in communities of extreme poverty throughout the Republic of Panama.

In 2008 Berklee College of Music approached Pérez with opportunity to design a curriculum that could serve as a platform for his work as an artist and humanitarian that could be taught to generations of gifted musicians for years to come. In 2009 he was named the founder and Artistic Director for the Berklee Global Jazz Institute; a creative music institute with a progressive vision to develop the artist of the new millennium. About the Institute Pérez states, "the practice of sharing humanity through performance experience is the core of the curriculum and I work with gifted musicians to become leaders in the world community to affect positive social change with one common goal: to develop the creative cultural Ambassadors of the new millennium.

In the year 2008 the album Across the Crystal Sea was released. A collaboration between Danilo Perez and the prolific composer and arranger Claus Ogerman. Praised by The Guardian as "So ultra-smooth it achieves something like a state of grace". Claus Ogerman said "This is a record I wanted to make before I leave the planet".

In the 2010 Perez released Providencia, which was also nominated for a Grammy Award in the category of "Best Instrumental Jazz Album". Regarding Pérez's 2014 release Panama 500, Harvard Professor David Carrasco remarked "Danilo's musical vision says 'Presente' to the musical tones, timbres, lips and dedos who discovered what only this year we learn while listening to Panama 500, the truth that what we think of as modest, little Panamá, IS also the center of the world,' our becoming world of music, human dialogue, human possibility and pleasure."

Pérez has received commissions from many chamber groups and his work often finds inspiration in the people, journeys and events that shaped the origins of the Americas. In 2011 the Imani Winds commissioned Pérez as part of their legacy commissioning for his composition Travesias Panameñas. In 2012 Pérez was commissioned by Carnegie Hall to compose an octet for members of the Simón Bolívar Symphony Orchestra of Venezuela. Pérez describes the work, Cuentos del Mar, as, "a brushstroke of the oceanic museum of life-the place where we see ourselves depicted, hopeful or mistaken. It is a story of ambition and colonization, a new world that is full of hope and ready to change the course of humanity.

Another commission in 2013 by the Banff Center for his piece Camino de Cruces, written for the Cecilia Quartet. A three-movement crossover work for piano and string quartet. About this work Pérez states, "Camino de Cruces tries to create a personal journey that captures the different challenges the Spaniards, native Indians, and slaves may have faced during their journey from the Atlantic to the Pacific during colonization. At the base of the piece is folkloric counterpoint: native Indian, African, and European cultures blending their influences to create a hybrid form in order to represent Panama as a melting pot". Perez continues "This piece is based on my concept called three-dimensional music that combines jazz, Pan-American folklore, and classical music. It has melodic references to traditional Panamanian folklore mixed with North American blues and improvisations, fused with harmonic language from my background in classical music and jazz." - Danilo Perez.

In 2015 Pérez was commissioned by the Museum of Biodiversity in Panama designed by architect Frank Gehry to compose a site specific work. For this occasion Pérez developed a tridimensional music concept where 3 different musical stories could be heard individually and/or together depending on where the listener stood in the gallery. The four-part composition was intended as a soundtrack for one of the museum's permanent exhibitions The Human Path. with each movement of the work corresponding to one of four key eras: the beginning of man, the development of the native culture, colonization, and modernity. Perez once dreamed of bringing a world-class jazz club to Panama and the dream became realized as the opening of Danilo's Jazz Club on Sunday, February 23, 2014.

In 2015 Pérez premiered two brand new commissions. In July, his composition "Expeditions- Panamania 2015"  was performed at the Panamerican games in Toronto. The same year in September, he also premiered his "Detroit World Suite- La leyenda de Bayano at the Detroit Jazz Festival. Some of Perez's accomplishments include The Legacy Award from the Smithsonian Latino Center, the ASICOM International Award from the University of Oviedo and the Gloria Career Achievement Award from the International Latino Cultural Center of Chicago are among the significant acknowledgements he has received for his work. Pérez previously served as Goodwill Ambassador to UNICEF and currently serves as an UNESCO Artist for Peace and as Cultural Ambassador to the Republic of Panama. In 2016 Pérez received an honorary doctorate from the University of Panama. Mr Perez's work continues to receive recognition all around the world and in 2017 the Puerto Rico Heineken Jazz Festival  dedicated its edition in honor and the work of Panamanian pianist Danilo Pérez. In 2018 Danilo Pérez won the United States Artists Fellowship and the Victoriano Lorenzo Award.

Recording as a leader
In 1992, he released his first solo album, Danilo Pérez, and then his second, The Journey, in 1994. He performed The Journey in concert with the Panamanian Symphony Orchestra the same year. The album is a musical account of the trip enslaved Africans made across the ocean, beginning with "The Capture", through "The Taking", "Chains", The Voyage", and ending with "Libre Spiritus". David Sanchez and Giovanni Hidalgo play on the album, which was recorded in two days at the Power Station in New York City. The album made it to the top ten jazz lists in The Village Voice, The New York Times, The Boston Globe, and Billboard magazine. It was named one of the best albums of the 1990s by DownBeat magazine.

In 1998, Central Avenue, Pérez's fourth album, received a Grammy nomination for Best Latin Jazz Album. Central Avenue is a blend of influences from blues, folk, and Caribbean and Middle Eastern genres. It was produced by Tommy LiPuma, who worked with Pérez on PanaMonk. Pérez arranged the ensemble of bassists John Patitucci and Avishai Cohen, and drummer Jeff "Tain" Watts. The songs were done in one take, except for "Panama Blues". For this song, Pérez recorded Raul Vital, a Panamanian folk singer, and a chorus of mejorana singers in Panama, then returned with the recording to New York City, where the ensemble contributed. Mejorana is an improvisational style of singing. Pérez told Graybow of Billboard, "[I heard] the blues in their voices, much like the blues down in Mississippi", and instantly wanted to record them.

In 2015 Perez recorded Children of the Light. Children of the Light is the name of the album and also the name of the trio which features pianist Danilo Perez, bassist John Patitucci and drummer Brian Blade all rhythm section members of the Wayne Shorter Quartet.

Awards

Commissioned work

Discography

As a leader

As a sideman

References

External links
 
 Mack Avenue Artist Page
 Podcast featuring "Galactic Panama" by Danilo Pérez

1965 births
Living people
Berklee College of Music faculty
GRP Records artists
Grammy Award winners
Impulse! Records artists
Latin jazz musicians
New England Conservatory faculty
Panamanian jazz musicians
Verve Records artists
20th-century Panamanian musicians
21st-century Panamanian musicians
Mack Avenue Records artists
ArtistShare artists
EmArcy Records artists
Concord Records artists